Minnaminugu is a 1957 Indian Malayalam-language film, directed by Ramu Kariat. The film stars Premji and Manavalan Joseph. It was released on 24 May 1957.

Plot

Cast 
 Premji
 Manavalan Joseph
 Santha Devi
 Kochattil Balakrishna Menon
 Vasanthi (debut)
 S Devan

Production 
Minnaminugu is the first film independently directed by Ramu Kariat. Filming took place at Premiere Studios, Mysore.

Soundtrack 
The music was composed by M. S. Baburaj, in his film debut. It is also the film debut of playback singer Machad Vasanthi .

References

External links 
 

1957 films
1950s Malayalam-language films